Kant is a surname borne by:

People
Agnes Kant (born 1967), Dutch politician
Farida Kant, Italian drag queen
Hari Kant (born 1969), Canadian field hockey player
Hermann Kant (1926-2016), German writer
Immanuel Kant (1724-1804), German philosopher
Krishan Kant (1927-2002), Vice President of India
Lewis Kant (born 1952), Mexican artist and writer

Fictional characters
Eva Kant, Italian comic book character
 Shantanu Kant, one of the protagonists of Bahu Hamari Rajni Kant, an Indian TV series

See also
Cant (surname)
Kante (surname)

German-language surnames